
Tuetenseeli (Tuetesee) is a lake in Menznau, Canton of Lucerne, Switzerland. Its surface area is 2.15 ha. The lake and its surrounding bogs are a nature preserve.

Lakes of the canton of Lucerne
Lakes of Switzerland
Protected areas of Switzerland